Aichryson villosum is a species of herbaceous flowering plants in the family Crassulaceae endemic to the Madeira Archipelago. The species was first described by Sabin Berthelot and Philip Barker-Webb in 1840, published in Natural History of the Canary Islands. Aichryson santamariensis was previously included in this species, but is now (since November 2015) considered a different species endemic to Santa Maria Island, Azores.

References

Further reading
Castroviejo, S. (coord. gen.). 1986-2012. Flora iberica 1-8, 10-15, 17-18, 21. Real Jardín Botánico (Royal Botanical Garden), CSIC, Madrid.

villosum
Endemic flora of Madeira